Stanimir (Cyrillic script: Станимир) is a Slavic origin given name built of two parts: stani "to become" and mir "peace, glory, prestige" or "world", meaning "to become a world" (see Book of Genesis 1:3). Feminine forms are: Stanimira and Stanimirka. Nicknames: Stanko, Staszek, Staś, Mirek, Mirko. The name may refer to:

Stanimir Atanasov (born 1976), Bulgarian sprint canoeist
Stanimir Dimitrov (born 1972), former Bulgarian footballer
Stanimir Dimov-Valkov (born 1978), Bulgarian defender
Stanimir Georgiev (born 1975), retired Bulgarian professional football forward
Stanimir Gospodinov (born 1975), football defender from Bulgaria
Stanimir Ilchev (born 1953), Bulgarian politician and Member of the European Parliament
Stanimir Milošković (born 1983), Serbian footballer
Stanimir Mitev (born 1985), Bulgarian footballer
Stanimir Penchev (born 1959), retired Bulgarian pole vaulter
Stanimir Stoilov (born 1967), former Bulgarian footballer
Stanimir Todorov (born 1982), Bulgarian pair skater
Stanimir Vukićević (born 1948), the Ambassador Serbia to the Russian Federation

See also

Slavic names

External links

Slavic masculine given names
Belarusian masculine given names
Bulgarian masculine given names
Croatian masculine given names
Czech masculine given names
Macedonian masculine given names
Montenegrin masculine given names
Slovak masculine given names
Slovene masculine given names
Polish masculine given names
Serbian masculine given names
Ukrainian masculine given names